The Lake No. 1 Bridge is a historic bridge carrying Avondale Road across the northern tip of Lake Number 1 in North Little Rock, Arkansas. It is a closed-spandrel stone arch bridge with Rustic styling, built in the 1920s as part of the Lakewood development promoted by developer Justin Mathews. It was one of eight stone arch bridges built in the state between 1923 and 1939, and one of the few that was privately built.

The bridge was listed on the National Register of Historic Places in 1990.

See also
List of bridges documented by the Historic American Engineering Record in Arkansas
List of bridges on the National Register of Historic Places in Arkansas
National Register of Historic Places listings in Pulaski County, Arkansas

References

External links

Road bridges on the National Register of Historic Places in Arkansas
Buildings and structures in North Little Rock, Arkansas
Historic American Engineering Record in Arkansas
National Register of Historic Places in Pulaski County, Arkansas
Stone arch bridges in the United States
Bridges completed in the 1920s
1920s establishments in Arkansas
Transportation in Pulaski County, Arkansas